S520 may refer to :
 S-520, a Japanese sounding rocket
 Canon S520, a Canon S Series digital camera
 Coolpix S520, a 10 Megapixels Nikon Coolpix series digital camera